In 2018–19, the South Africa national rugby sevens team participated in the 2018–19 World Rugby Sevens Series, the 20th edition of the competition since its inception in 1999–2000.

Squad

The following players were named in the South Africa national rugby sevens squad for the 2018–19 World Rugby Sevens Series:

Tournaments

Dubai Sevens

The 2018 Dubai Sevens took place from 30 November to 1 December 2018. South Africa were drawn in Pool A of the competition, alongside Argentina, Samoa and Zimbabwe. They beat Zimbabwe and Samoa, and — despite losing their final match to Argentina — finished top of Pool A. They lost to England in their Cup quarter final to drop into the 5th-place play-off. They beat Scotland in the semi-final of that competition, but lost to Fiji in the final to finish sixth in the tournament.

The Pool A log:

The matches played were:

The player record for the tournament is:

Cape Town Sevens

The 2018 Cape Town Sevens took place from 8 to 9 December 2018. South Africa were drawn in Pool A of the competition, alongside New Zealand, Samoa and Zimbabwe. They beat Zimbabwe and Samoa, and — despite losing their final match to New Zealand — finished top of Pool A. They beat Scotland in the Cup quarter final, before losing to Fiji in the semi-final. They finished in third place after beating New Zealand in the bronze final.

The Pool A log:

The matches played were:

The player record for the tournament is:

Hamilton Sevens

The 2019 Hamilton Sevens took place from 26 to 27 January 2019. South Africa were drawn in Pool C of the competition, alongside France, Kenya and Scotland. They won all three matches in the pool stage to finish top of Pool C. They beat Samoa in their Cup quarter final, but lost to Fiji in the semi-finals, and to New Zealand in the bronze final to finish fourth in the tournament.

The Pool C log:

The matches played were:

The player record for the tournament is:

Sydney Sevens

The 2019 Sydney Sevens took place from 2 to 3 February 2019. South Africa were drawn in Pool D of the competition, alongside Argentina, Australia and Tonga. They beat Tonga and Argentina, and — despite losing their final match to Australia — finished top of Pool D. They lost to England in their Cup quarter final to drop into the 5th-place play-off. They beat Spain in the semi-final of that competition and beat Australia in the final to finish fifth in the tournament.

The Pool D log:

The matches played were:

The player record for the tournament is:

Las Vegas Sevens

The 2019 Las Vegas Sevens took place from 1 to 3 March 2019. South Africa were drawn in Pool C of the competition, alongside Chile, England and Japan. They beat Japan and England and drew against Chile to finish top of Pool C. They lost to the United States in their Cup quarter final to drop into the 5th-place play-off. They lost to Fiji in the semi-final of that competition to finish seventh/eighth in the tournament.

The Pool C log:

The matches played were:

The player record for the tournament is:

Vancouver Sevens

The 2019 Vancouver Sevens took place from 9 to 10 March 2019. South Africa were drawn in Pool A of the competition, alongside Chile, the United States and Wales. They beat Chile, Wales and the United States to finish top of Pool A. They beat Argentina in their Cup quarter final, Fiji in their Cup semi-final and France in the final to win the tournament.

The Pool A log:

The matches played were:

The player record for the tournament is:

Hong Kong Sevens

The 2019 Hong Kong Sevens took place from 5 to 7 April 2019. South Africa were drawn in Pool A of the competition, alongside Japan, Samoa and Scotland. They beat all three teams to finish top of Pool A. They lost to the United States in their Cup quarter final to drop into the 5th-place play-off. They lost to Argentina in the semi-final of that competition to finish seventh/eighth in the tournament.

The Pool A log:

The matches played were:

The player record for the tournament is:

Singapore Sevens

The 2019 Singapore Sevens took place from 13 to 14 April 2019. South Africa were drawn in Pool A of the competition, alongside Canada, Fiji and Scotland. They beat all three sides to finish top of Pool A. They beat Samoa in their Cup quarter final, the United States in their Cup semi-final and Fiji in the final to win the tournament.

The Pool A log:

The matches played were:

The player record for the tournament is:

London Sevens

The 2019 London Sevens took place from 25 to 26 May 2019. South Africa were drawn in Pool A of the competition, alongside Argentina, Canada and Japan. They beat all three teams to finish top of Pool A. They lost to Australia in their Cup quarter final to drop into the 5th-place play-off. They lost to New Zealand in the semi-final of that competition to finish seventh/eighth in the tournament.

The Pool A log:

The matches played were:

The player record for the tournament is:

Paris Sevens

The 2019 Paris Sevens took place from 1 to 2 June 2019. South Africa were drawn in Pool B of the competition, alongside Australia, Kenya and Wales. They beat all three sides to finish top of Pool B. They beat Samoa in their Cup quarter final, but lost to New Zealand in their Cup semi-final. They finished in third place after beating the United States in the bronze final.

The Pool B log:

The matches played were:

The player record for the tournament is:

Player statistics

The appearance record for players that represented the South Africa national rugby sevens team in 2018–19 is as follows:

See also

 South Africa national rugby sevens team
 2018–19 World Rugby Sevens Series

References

South Africa national rugby sevens team
South Africa